Ronald McKenzie Murray (15 June 1927 – 8 April 1951) was a New Zealand cricketer who played first-class cricket for Wellington from 1947 to 1951. 

Ron Murray was a right-arm medium-pace bowler and useful lower-order batsman. He first played for Wellington in February 1947 at the age of 19, and the following month he opened the bowling and took 3 for 43 and 5 for 85 for Wellington against the touring MCC. His victims in the second innings were Laurie Fishlock, Bill Edrich, Denis Compton, Wally Hammond and Godfrey Evans.

He was the second-most successful bowler in the Plunket Shield in 1947-48, taking 13 wickets at an average of 28.00. He was less successful in 1948-49, and although he took part in the trial matches, he failed to win a place in the New Zealand team for England in 1949.

Murray returned to form in 1949-50 and was again the second-most successful bowler in the Plunket Shield, taking 13 wickets at an average of 14.61, and helping Wellington win the championship for the first time since 1935-36. In the first match he took a hat-trick to reduce Otago's first innings from 116 for 2 to 116 for 5; Wellington won by seven wickets.

Murray was a journalist for the Evening Post in Wellington. He was considered a likely Test player, but he died aged 23 on 8 April 1951 from injuries he received when he fell while visiting a sick friend at Hanmer Springs in Canterbury. 

Beginning with the 1951-52 season the Ron Murray Cup has been awarded annually to the leading wicket-taker in Wellington senior club cricket.

References

External links
 
 

1927 births
1951 deaths
New Zealand cricketers
Wellington cricketers
Cricketers from Wellington City
Accidental deaths from falls
North Island cricketers